"Tuesday Morning Quarterback" was a column written by Gregg Easterbrook that started in 2000 and published every football season until temporarily stopping publication for the 2016 season. The column moved to The Weekly Standard for the 2017 NFL season, debuting on August 22, 2017.

The column is noted for its length (it often runs over 15 pages in printed form) and frequent sidetracking into political and non-football-related discussion. Easterbrook commonly includes a "Running Items Department", football haiku and senryū, "Cheerbabe Cheesecake" and "Equal-Time Beefcake", "obscure college-football scores" including his obsession with Indiana of Pennsylvania and California of Pennsylvania, and continual references to Christmas creep & the general trend of pushing events earlier and earlier (which he refers to as the "Unified Field Theory of Creep").

The column derives its name from the phrase "Monday morning quarterback", a derogatory term for a pundit (and the name of a competing long-read column by Peter King of Sports Illustrated). The change in day reflects its typical publishing date of Tuesday, which also allows the column to address that week's Monday Night Football contest. He also guarantees "All Predictions Wrong or Your Money Back."  Since the column is free, there is nothing to be refunded.

On May 13, 2015, Easterbrook announced that ESPN had not renewed TMQ.

Easterbrook joined The Upshot, the blog of The New York Times, for the 2015 NFL season. The column went on hiatus in 2016. For the 2017 season, Easterbrook's columns were published by The Weekly Standard, until Week 15, when the whole magazine folded.

Recurring themes
General themes which recur in the column include:

An emphasis on solid football fundamentals, as opposed to what Easterbrook considers an overemphasis on flashy, but risky, and often foolish plays, designed to obtain greater media coverage.
Bemoaning the tendency of teams to pass instead of run the football.
Analysis of coaching strategy and various excellent or atrocious plays and games.
Contending that most successful plays are usually the product of good offensive or defensive line play, rather than the prowess of any individual quarterback, running back or wide receiver.
Criticizing the overuse of the blitz
Commenting on coaches punting or kicking field goals instead of trying for first downs or touchdowns, which he mocks as "cowardly".
Mockery of most coaches in general, except for Bill Belichick with whom he has a conflicted relationship, due to his brilliant coaching yet recent ethical lapses.
Mockery of various publicity stunts and other public actions from individuals in the football world whom he considers foolish.
A continuing tirade against the NFL Sunday Ticket product available only through DirectTV, which he considers an illegal monopoly and an example of a for-profit corporation taking advantage of municipal taxpayers, who fund NFL stadium construction.
 Advocates a "no punting" strategy on 4th down plays, as well as going for a two-point conversion when trailing by one in the final seconds of a game, citing the higher expected value of a successful conversion vs. turning the ball over to the opponent, and bemoaning coaches who do not take the risk. The crux of Easterbrook's argument is that the average yards gained on a play is 5 yards. Analysts, however, have stated this theory is short-sighted, since it does not take into account the fact that 4th-and-short attempts usually face goal-line defenses; as such, the two-point conversion, which takes place only two yards from the end zone, is more likely to fail than not, with a 40% success rate. Easterbrook disputes this analysis and claims that the real percentage is between 50% and 55%.
 Criticizing several local markets' tendency to air lackluster games as opposed to more competitive matchups, except when a local team is playing, which by NFL rules with the television contracts are required to be shown in their home market in their entirety.
 Criticizing teams that make uniform changes, having cited only four recent team uniform changes (New England, Philadelphia, San Diego, and St. Louis) as being an improvement. In particular, Easterbrook hates the monochrome look of several teams, leading to the cognomen for Atlanta, Denver, and Seattle, while having mixed opinions on teams wearing throwbacks, favoring the Chargers' 1960s look, Buffalo Bills O. J. Simpson-era uniforms, and the Redskins 70th Anniversary throwbacks but not caring much for throwbacks worn by the Eagles, Steelers, or the New York Jets decision to return to the Joe Namath-era uniforms full-time in 1998.
 Highlighting examples of running up the score at all levels of football and counterexamples of the same team losing, as an illustration of bad karma. (Easterbrook will occasionally and facetiously compare the two scores, add the margin of loss to the margin of victory, and extrapolate a transitive relation, suggesting that the team whom the runners lost to would have beaten the team the runners had won against by an even larger margin.) Easterbrook does not object to running up the score in the NFL, with the caveat that tragedy follows greed for those who do so.

Easterbrook also espouses certain football superstitions attributed to a "pantheon" of "football gods" who bestow victory upon the team with the least warmly dressed coach (Cold Coach = Victory), the most sportsmanlike conduct, the most spirited play, or the most scantily dressed cheerleaders (especially in cold weather); Easterbrook also highlights one particularly attractive cheerleader from an NFL team each week.

Also, the column is known for randomly placed items and rants on various topics on politics, science fiction, actual science, and various television, film, and pop culture items.  Photographs and captions accompany the columns which are often designed to be ridiculously humorous metaphors or caricatures of various persons or items mentioned in the column.

"TMQ" team nicknames
Easterbrook refers to teams by nicknames or "cognomen", such as "Potomac Drainage Basin Indigenous Persons" (Washington Redskins) and "Arizona CAUTION: MAY CONTAIN FOOTBALL-LIKE SUBSTANCE Cardinals" (Arizona Cardinals). The nicknames are usually used only if a team is struggling or if the team made a boneheaded play that cost them a game. One exception is the Redskins, whom Easterbrook criticized because of the team's Native American mascot. The nicknames also extends into college football, calling the Miami Hurricanes the "Miami Tropical Storms" having been downgraded from a hurricane to a tropical storm, likely in reference to the 2011 scandal.

Beginning with the 2014 season, Easterbrook largely abandoned cognomens for teams, preferring to call the teams by their actual names. Exceptions were made for the Redskins (whose nickname had got more mainstream controversy in recent years and was ultimately retired in 2020) and teams that play a considerable distance from their home city like the Giants, Jets, and 49ers. As of the 2017 season, Easterbrook still maintains an official list of cognomen.

Easterbrook also frequently referred to defensive coordinator Gregg Williams as being "tastefully named", due to the two sharing the first name of Gregg. He has used the nickname throughout Williams' various coaching stops in Buffalo, Washington, New Orleans and St. Louis, but apparently stopped it once Williams' role in the New Orleans Saints bounty scandal was revealed and he was banned indefinitely from the league.

Tuesday Morning Quarterback Non-QB Non-RB NFL MVP award
According to Easterbrook, the "longest [named] award in sports". This is the top award in a series of awards he publishes at the end of each season, known as the "All-Unwanted All-Pros." These awards were created due to Easterbrook's view that the awards and Pro Bowl selection of various sports media outlets and the NFL tended to unfairly reward what he considered "glory boy" positions, such as quarterbacks, running backs, and wide receivers, as well as players who tended to be better known due to higher press coverage as opposed to actual quality of play. (New England Patriots wideout Troy Brown, who won the award in 2004 despite primarily being a wide receiver, was considered an exception since he also played cornerback that season after the Patriots had a rash of injuries at the position during the season.) Easterbrook also was protesting the lack of attention given to offensive or defensive linemen whom he considers the most important positions in football. Criteria tend to vary from year to year but generally includes players who either were undrafted or cut from previous teams, but otherwise managed to play important or pivotal roles with their current teams over the course of the season. The 2013 award, given to Seattle Seahawks cornerback Richard Sherman, was the first to be determined by online voting from TMQ readers. Most of the winners through the 2011 season were offensive linemen, but the last five winners have been defensive players.

Kill Bill controversy
ESPN fired Easterbrook after he made comments about Jewish Hollywood executives and film Kill Bill on a blog hosted by The New Republic. Easterbrook apologized for his comments and resumed his "Tuesday Morning Quarterback" column, temporarily for two weeks on the independent website Football Outsiders, and then more permanently for NFL.com. During his stint on NFL.com, Easterbrook was also an analyst for the then-fledgling NFL Network. On April 24, 2006, it was announced that Easterbrook would be brought back to ESPN's website after a two-year absence. His return column, a preview of the 2006 NFL Draft, appeared the following day.

Spygate
Easterbook's column has been highly critical of Bill Belichick with relation to the "Spygate" controversy, calling for Belichick's suspension from the league.  Easterbrook's most controversial article was "Suspending Belichick will bring closure to Spygate". Easterbrook's imaginative proposals led one reader to mockingly call him "Mr. Fantasy."

Easterbrook's  response to Spygate was criticized by his fellow "Page Two" columnist (and self-professed Patriots fan) Bill Simmons. "If you have a national column in which you're excoriating a sports team for cheating even though it already paid a severe penalty for what it did, and you're hinting more revelations are coming down the road, and then it's proven you were barking up the wrong tree ... you need to admit defeat and quit blowing the situation out of proportion. No, really."
After the Rams and Patriots again reached the Super Bowl in 2019, Easterbrook tweeted the accusation that Belichick videotaped the Rams walkthrough the first time around.

References

External links
 Tuesday Morning Quarterback articles at The Weekly Standard

ESPN.com